Greatest Hits is a compilation by English singer Rick Astley released in the UK in 2002 and in the US a year later. While the American version features alternate mixes focused between 1987 and 1991, the European version features hits up to his 2002 album Keep It Turned On. It sold over 100,000 copies in the UK and was certified gold by the BPI.

The UK release saw the debut appearance of Astley's 2001 single "Sleeping", thus making it a brand-new track for listeners.

Track listing
All tracks composed by Stock Aitken Waterman unless stated otherwise.

European version
 "Never Gonna Give You Up" – 3:33 from Whenever You Need Somebody
 "Whenever You Need Somebody" (Single Version) – 3:27 from Whenever You Need Somebody
 "When I Fall in Love" – 3:03 (composed by Edward Heyman and Victor Young) from Whenever You Need Somebody
 "My Arms Keep Missing You" – 3:13
 "Together Forever" – 3:22 from Whenever You Need Somebody
 "It Would Take a Strong Strong Man" – 3:40 from Whenever You Need Somebody
 "She Wants to Dance with Me" – 3:16 from Hold Me in Your Arms
 "Take Me to Your Heart" – 3:29 from Hold Me in Your Arms
 "Hold Me in Your Arms" – 4:32 (composed by Rick Astley) from Hold Me in Your Arms
 "Cry for Help" (Single Version) – 4:06 (composed by Rob Fisher and Rick Astley) from Free
 "Move Right Out" – 3:54 (composed by Rob Fisher and Rick Astley) from Free
 "Never Knew Love" – 3:07 (composed by John Paul and Derek Bordeaux) from Free
 "The Ones You Love" (Single Version) – 4:20 (composed by Dave West and Rick Astley) from Body & Soul
 "Hopelessly" – 3:36 (composed by Rob Fisher and Rick Astley) from Body & Soul
 "Body and Soul" – 4:10 from Body & Soul
 "Sleeping" – 3:41 (composed by Rick Astley and Chris Braide) from Keep It Turned On

US version
 "Never Gonna Give You Up" – 3:33
 "It Would Take a Strong Strong Man" – 3:40
 "She Wants to Dance with Me (Watermix)" – 3:16
 "Whenever You Need Somebody" (7") – 3:27
 "Move Right Out" (7") – 3:54 (composed by Rob Fisher and Rick Astley)
 "Giving Up on Love" (7" R&B Version) – 4:07 (composed by Rick Astley)
 "Together Forever" (Lover's Leap 7" Remix) – 3:22
 "Take Me to Your Heart" (7") – 3:29
 "My Arms Keep Missing You" (The No L Mix) – 6:47
 "Ain't Too Proud to Beg" – 4:17 (composed by Eddie Holland and Norman Whitfield)
 "Hopelessly" – 3:36 (composed by Rob Fisher and Rick Astley)
 "When You Gonna" (12") – 7:34 (composed by Ian Curnow, Phil Harding and Rick Astley) (Credited to Rick and Lisa)
 "Never Knew Love" (Remix) – 3:07 (composed by John Paul and Derek Bordeaux)
 "Hold Me in Your Arms" (7") – 4:32 (composed by Rick Astley)
 "When I Fall in Love" – 3:03 (composed by Edward Heyman and Victor Young)
 "Cry for Help" (Single) – 4:05 (composed by Rob Fisher and Rick Astley)
 "The Ones You Love" (Single) – 4:20 (composed by Dave West and Rick Astley)

Charts

Singles

"When You Gonna"

"When You Gonna" is a duet by Rick Astley and Lisa Fabien which appears on the albums When You Gonna and Greatest Hits. The song was released in May 1987, and with no promotion managed to chart at No. 17 in the Netherlands and No. 20 in Belgium. It also charted on the US Billboard Dance Club Songs chart at No. 11. It was the first single to feature Astley, prior to his international debut solo number one hit "Never Gonna Give You Up".

 7" single
 "When You Gonna"  3:28
 "When You Gonna (Dub Mix)"  5:48

References

2002 greatest hits albums
Rick Astley compilation albums